Kennedy Bay (also called Kennedy's Bay and Harataunga) is a locality in the north eastern Coromandel Peninsula of New Zealand. The Harataunga and Omoho Streams flow from the Coromandel Range past the settlement and into the bay to the east.

There are several companies aquafarming paua, lobster and mussels in the bay.

History and culture
The area originally belonged to Ngāti Huarere, who gave it to Ngāti Tamaterā in recognition of their help after a conflict with Ngāti Hei. They gave it to Ngāti Porou, who had used it as a shelter during trading trips to Auckland, in thanks for assistance against the Ngā Puhi in the Musket Wars of the early 19th century.

In July 1815, the schooner Brothers and the Trial were attacked by local Māori with the loss of several crew from both vessels. The incident may have been provoked by unscrupulous trading by a Captain Hovell earlier.

Te Paea o Hauraki Marae is located at Kennedy Bay. It is a tribal meeting ground for Ngāti Tamaterā and includes Te Paea meeting house.

Education
The school was established in 1996.

Demographics
The SA1 area is part of the larger Colville statistical area.

The SA1 statistical area had a population of 219 at the 2018 New Zealand census, an increase of 57 people (35.2%) since the 2013 census, and an increase of 42 people (23.7%) since the 2006 census. There were 60 households, comprising 117 males and 102 females, giving a sex ratio of 1.15 males per female. The median age was 44.8 years (compared with 37.4 years nationally), with 36 people (16.4%) aged under 15 years, 39 (17.8%) aged 15 to 29, 105 (47.9%) aged 30 to 64, and 39 (17.8%) aged 65 or older.

Ethnicities were 52.1% European/Pākehā, 74.0% Māori, and 6.8% Pacific peoples. People may identify with more than one ethnicity.

Although some people chose not to answer the census's question about religious affiliation, 52.1% had no religion, 30.1% were Christian, 5.5% had Māori religious beliefs, 1.4% were Hindu, 1.4% were Buddhist and 4.1% had other religions.

Of those at least 15 years old, 9 (4.9%) people had a bachelor's or higher degree, and 51 (27.9%) people had no formal qualifications. The median income was $20,100, compared with $31,800 nationally. 12 people (6.6%) earned over $70,000 compared to 17.2% nationally. The employment status of those at least 15 was that 66 (36.1%) people were employed full-time, 36 (19.7%) were part-time, and 12 (6.6%) were unemployed.

See also 
 Messrs. Smyth Brothers' Tramway

Notes

Thames-Coromandel District
Populated places in Waikato
Ngāti Huarere
Ngāti Tamaterā
Ngāti Porou